is a railway station in Chikugo, Fukuoka Prefecture, Japan, operated by JR Kyushu.

Lines 

All Tsubame services and some Sakura services stop at the station.

Layout 
The station is actually two separate facilities which share a common forecourt. The Kagoshima Main Line station, located slightly to the west, consists  has two side platforms serving two tracks at grade. The station building, a modern concrete structure houses a waiting room, and a ticket window. Access to the opposite side platform is by means of a footbridge which is equipped with elevators. There is a tourism information centre located at the entrance to the station.

Management of the Kagoshima Main Line station has been outsourced to the JR Kyushu Tetsudou Eigyou Co., a wholly owned subsidiary of JR Kyushu specialising in station services. It staffs the ticket counter which is equipped with a Midori no Madoguchi facility.

The Shinkansen station is located across the forecourt to the east of the conventional station, connected by a sheltered walkway. This station consists of a side and an island platform, designated as platforms 11, 12 and 13, serving three elevated tracks. The station building is built into the elevated structure and houses a waiting area and a ticket window staffed by JR Kyushu. Access to the platforms is by steps, escalators of elevators.

Platforms

History
The station was opened by Japanese Government Railways (JGR) on 20 July 1928 with the name  as an additional station on the existing Kagoshima Main Line track. With the privatization of Japanese National Railways (JNR), the successor of JGR, on 1 April 1987, JR Kyushu took over control of the station. With the inauguration of the Kyushu Shinkansen service to the station, the station building was moved 500 metres south and reopened with new Shinkansen platforms on 12 March 2011 and renamed Chikugo-Funangoya. The location of the old station was converted into a maintenance depot.

Passenger statistics
In fiscal 2016, the station was used by an average of 1,049 passengers daily (boarding passengers only), and it ranked 159th among the busiest stations of JR Kyushu.

See also
 Nishi Kyushu Shinkansen#History
 List of railway stations in Japan

References

External links
Chikugo-funagoya Station (JR Kyushu)

Railway stations in Fukuoka Prefecture
Railway stations in Japan opened in 1928